Branden Ledbetter (born May 2, 1986) is a former American football tight end. Following his college career at Western Michigan University, he was invited to the Green Bay Packers Rookie Mini Camp as an undrafted free agent in 2009 but was cut shortly after.

Early years
Ledbetter played high school football and track for Hollywood Hills High School in Hollywood, Florida, before transferring his junior year to St. Thomas Aquinas High School in Fort Lauderdale, Florida, where he graduated in 2004.

College career
Ledbetter played football at Western Michigan University, and was a standout tight end. During his career at Western Michigan University, he recorded 131 receptions and 1,513 receiving yards with 20 touchdowns in his career. He finished his career ranked second among tight ends in both receptions and receiving yards in school history. He is the Broncos all-time touchdown leader for tight ends with 20 touchdowns. He was also a semi-finalist in voting for the John Mackey Award (nation's best tight end) as a senior. Following Ledbetter's final season at WMU, he was invited to the Texas vs The Nation All-Star game in El Paso, Texas, where he represented WMU on the Texas team.

Professional career

California Redwoods
Ledbetter was drafted on June 18, 2009 in the inaugural 2009 UFL Draft, chosen 1st pick overall by the California Redwoods of the United Football League.

Spokane Shock
Ledbetter signed with the Spokane Shock of the Arena Football League on December 12, 2011.

References

External links
Just Sports Stats
Branden Ledbetter WMU TE #82 highlight video
Western Michigan University bio

American football tight ends
Western Michigan Broncos football players
1986 births
Living people
Players of American football from Fort Lauderdale, Florida
Players of American football from Dallas
Sacramento Mountain Lions players
Green Bay Packers players
Sportspeople from Hollywood, Florida